The Tana (  or ;  ;) is a  long river in the Sápmi area of northern Fennoscandia. The river flows through Troms og Finnmark county, Norway and the Lapland region of Finland. The Sámi name means "Great River". The main tributaries of Tana are Anarjohka and Karasjohka.

Geography

In its upper course it runs for  along the Finnish–Norwegian border, between the municipalities of Utsjoki, Finland and Karasjok and Tana, Norway. The river is the fifth longest in Norway. The last  of the river run through the municipality of Tana in Norway. The river discharges into the Tanafjorden, one of the largest and most unspoiled river deltas in Europe. The delta is protected and is an important home to wetland birds. There are large deposits of sand in the delta that are exposed sandbars at low tide.

Fishing
In 2022, authorities in Norway and in Finland will not permit salmon fishing (in the river).

The Tana is well known for its excellent salmon fishery and is the most productive salmon river in Finland and Norway.

In 2020,  was the annual total of salmon captured in the river. Both Finland and Norway regulate the fishing on the river and drift net fishing is allowed on the river.

Transportation

The Sami Bridge at Utsjoki was constructed in 1993. The European route E6 highway follows the western shoreline of the river for most of the length of the river.

In winter, there are usually two ice roads that are in use from December to April.

References

External links

Historiker: – En stor skandale innen naturforvaltning [Historian: – A great scandal in regard to conservation of nature] (10 April 2021) NRK
Angling in Tana river

Rivers of Troms og Finnmark
Rivers of Norway
Rivers of Finland
International rivers of Europe
Border rivers
Finland–Norway border
 
Nesseby
Karasjok
Tana, Norway
Rivers of Utsjoki